TJ Tempo Praha is a baseball club in the Czech Republic, which has changed its name in recent years. While initial founding of the club dates back to 1963, the club in its current standing was founded in 2001 by joining two former baseball clubs VSK Tegola Chemie Praha and TJ Tempo Praha. Since the 2005 season, the club has played under the name Tempo Titans Praha, and through the 2008 season, the club played in the Extraliga under the name of their general partner, Tegola Titans Praha. In 2009, the A team finished last in the Extraliga, then lost in relegation series to drop to the second division after 17 seasons of participating in the Extraliga. Over its 17 seasons in the Extraliga, the club posted an overall regular season record of 227-250.

Teams & competitions

A team standings in competitions

Roster

Highlights 
 Winner of Czech Baseball Cup: 1994
 Czech Extraliga vice champion: 1994, 2003
 Českomoravská liga champions: 2012

External links 
 official club webpage

Baseball in the Czech Republic